Live By the Drum is the first album by Canadian singer-songwriter Wab Kinew.

Track listing

References

2009 albums
Wab Kinew albums